Wollaston is a village on the outskirts of Stourbridge in the English West Midlands. It is located in the south of the Dudley Metropolitan Borough, one mile from Stourbridge town centre.

History
Until 1974 when the West Midlands Metropolitan County was created, Wollaston was in Worcestershire.

Wollaston Hall
Wollaston Hall was a 17th-century mansion which stood in the village until 1924. It was later disassembled and shipped to North America, although nobody has been able to determine what happened to it after that. Panelling and a fireplace from the Hall are now in the Edsel and Eleanor Ford House in Grosse Pointe Shores, Michigan, which bears a striking resemblance to the original Hall.

Birthplace of steam locomotive
The Stourbridge Lion, built in Wollaston, was the first steam locomotive to run on a commercial line in the United States. Built by Foster, Rastrick and Company in Wollaston, the Stourbridge Lion's historic first run took place on 8 August 1829. The locomotive is now on view at the B&O Railroad museum, Baltimore MD, on loan from the Smithsonian Institution, Washington.

The foundry in Lowndes Road where the Stourbridge Lion was built, was under threat of demolition until work started in 2013/2014 to form the multimillion-pound Lion Health Centre

Wollaston Illuminations
The "Wollaston Illuminations" in Leonard Road were an annual Christmas lights display which attracted people from all over the Black Country to raise money for a chosen charity. Johnny Briggs, who played Mike Baldwin in the ITV soap Coronation Street and who lived in Stourbridge, switched on the lights several times over the years. In 2006, residents of Leonard Road decided to cancel the illuminations as a protest to food and drink vendors 'cashing in' on the fundraising event.

Present
Wollaston's main is thoroughfare is Bridgnorth Road, which is home to a few pubs, restaurants and shops. The Unicorn Inn is a Bathams pub which was built in 1859.

In 2014, Lion Health medical centre opened in the renovated former foundry of Foster, Rastrick and Company, a Grade II listed building. The next phase of regeneration on the foundry site will create parkland next to Stourbridge Canal with a "heritage and community hub" named Riverside House.

Education
Wollaston has two primary schools – The Ridge Primary School and St James's C of E Primary – and one secondary, Ridgewood High School.

Transport
The Stourbridge Canal skirts around the village linking the Staffordshire and Worcestershire Canal with the Dudley No 1 Canal, this places Wollaston on the Stourport Ring. The nearest train station is Stourbridge Town, and buses from Stourbridge run through the village. The Stourbridge to Bridgnorth A458 road runs through the village. Between 1901 and 1930, Wollaston was served by an electric tramway, the Kinver Light Railway. The main bus services are National Express West Midlands service 7 and 8 which connects Wollaston to Stourbridge,  Dudley and the Merry Hill Shopping Centre. The 8 service continues to Wolverhampton but it is quicker to change on to service 16 at Stourbridge Interchange.

Notable residents
 Frank Short, British printmaker and teacher of printmaking was born in Wollaston.
 Norman Whiting, English first-class cricketer was born in Wollaston.
 Don Kenyon, English first-class cricketer lived most of his adult life in Wollaston.
 Jan Pearson, actress known for her roles in Holby City and Doctors, was born and raised in Wollaston.

Further reading
A History of Wollaston, H.O.W. Group

References

External links
 History of Wollaston Group
 History of Wollaston Discussion Forum Not working (Dec 2018)
 Edsel Ford's House
 Stourbridge Lion 

Areas of Dudley
Stourbridge
Conservation areas in England